Honora may refer to:

 Honora (moth), a genus of snout moths
 Honora, Ontario, a community in Northeastern Manitoulin and the Islands, Canada

People with the given name
 Honora Burke (c. 1675 – 1698), Irish aristocrat
 Honora Denny (died 1614), English courtier
 Honora Enfield (1882–1935), British co-operative activist
 Honora Jenkins, English woman who was part of a 1778 case in English law
 Honora Kelley (1854–1938), birth name American serial killer Jane Toppan
 Honora Ornstein (1882–1975), one of the Americans known as Diamond Tooth Lil
 Honora Seymour, Lady Beauchamp, English noblewoman, wife of Edward Seymour
 Honora Seymour (bef. 1594–1620), English noblewoman, wife of Ferdinando Sutton
 Honora Sneyd (1751–1780), English writer
 Kathleen Honora Greatorex (1851–1942), American painter and illustrator

See also
 Onora, a given name
 Honorah Parker
 Honoria (disambiguation)
 Honor (given name)